István Kiss (born 19 December 1948) is a Hungarian gymnast. He competed in eight events at the 1972 Summer Olympics.

References

1948 births
Living people
Hungarian male artistic gymnasts
Olympic gymnasts of Hungary
Gymnasts at the 1972 Summer Olympics
Gymnasts from Budapest